Thomas Talbot Sullivan (September 14, 1892 – November 30, 1958) was an American football player and coach.  He served as the head football coach at George Washington University in 1916, Bates College from 1919 to 1920, and St. Lawrence University from 1925 to 1937.  Sullivan played college football as an end at Colgate University.  He also coached baseball at St. Lawrence. Sullivan returned to his alma mater, Colgate, in 1921 as an assistant football coach under head coach Ellery Huntington Jr.  He died on November 30, 1958, at Massena Memorial Hospital in Massena, New York, after suffering a heart attack.

Head coaching record

Football

References

External links
 

1892 births
1958 deaths
American football ends
Bates Bobcats football coaches
Clarkson Golden Knights football coaches
Colgate Raiders football coaches
Colgate Raiders football players
George Washington Colonials football coaches
St. Lawrence Saints baseball coaches
St. Lawrence Saints football coaches
High school football coaches in California
People from Massena, New York
Players of American football from New York (state)